Rhizocarpon petraeum is a species of lichen in the family Rhizocarpaceae. It contains stictic acid.

It was first described as Lichen petraeus in 1787 by Franz Xaver von Wulfen, but was transferred to the genus Rhizocarpon in 1852 by Abramo Bartolommeo Massalongo.

References

Rhizocarpaceae
Lichen species
Lichens described in 1787
Taxa named by Franz Xaver von Wulfen